The Ursuline High School, Wimbledon (“the Ursuline”) is a voluntary-aided, Roman Catholic Secondary School for girls aged 11 to 19. The school is based at Crescent Road and the Downs, Wimbledon, London. It was founded in 1892 by the Ursulines. It is affiliated with The Ursuline Preparatory School, its previous feeder preparatory school, as well as Wimbledon College, the high school's brother school, who have worked in partnership since 1986 and share joint Sixth Form. The school specialises in Business & Enterprise and Modern Foreign Languages and it was previously designated a Gifted & Talented Lead School.[1]

Pastoral care
Each year is split into seven tutor groups: Angela, Bernadette, Catherine, Francis, Margaret, Theresa, Ursula. A peer mentoring programme is in place where sixth form girls are paired with younger girls. Counselling is available through the Youth Awareness Programme, the Ursuline Sisters and the Cabrini Society.

Facilities
 The Main Building - RE, French, German, Spanish, Information and Communication, Science, 
 St. George - Mathematics
 Brescia - English, Design & Technology (Product Design)
 St. Ursula - Geography, History, Sociology, Psychology
 The Merici Sports Centre - PE
 St. Angela's Art Centre - Art, Music, Drama (Located on The Downs)
 Dorothy Kazel block - Business Studies, Health and Social Care, ICT

Notable former pupils
Siobhan Benita, politician
Jill Murphy, writer

See also
 Ursuline Preparatory School
 Ursulines

References

External links 
 School website
 DFES information
 Sixth Form Website
 Languages Website
 Ursuline High School - Ursulines UK

Girls' schools in London
Catholic secondary schools in the Archdiocese of Southwark
Secondary schools in the London Borough of Merton
Educational institutions established in 1892
1892 establishments in England
Ursuline schools
Voluntary aided schools in London
Buildings and structures in Wimbledon, London